Ricciardi is an Italian surname. Notable people with the surname include:

Antonio Ricardo or Antonio Ricciardi (1532–1605/1606), Italian printer working in South America
Michele Ricciardi (1672 – 1753), Italian painter
Armando Ricciardi (born 1905, death unknown), Italian Olympic boxer
J. P. Ricciardi (born 1959), American baseball executive
Giovanni Ricciardi (cellist) (born 1968), Italian cellist
Tony Ricciardi (born 1983), American computer businessman
Romano Ricciardi (born 1986), Italian/Swiss jazz saxophonist
Marlene Ricciardi (born 1992), Italian female canoeist
Sara Ricciardi (born 1996), Italian gymnast
Laura Ricciardi, American film-maker
Sabrina Ricciardi (born 1968), Italian politician
Richard Ricciardi, American professor of nursing
Victor Ricciardi, American professor of business and author

See also

Italian-language surnames
Patronymic surnames
Surnames from given names